John Joseph Orsino (April 22, 1938 – November 1, 2016) was a Major League Baseball catcher.  He was signed by the New York Giants as an amateur free agent before the 1957 season, and played for the San Francisco Giants (1961–1962),  Baltimore Orioles (1963–1965), and Washington Senators (1966–1967).

Born in Teaneck, New Jersey, Orsino grew up in nearby Fort Lee, where he attended Fort Lee High School.

Playing career
Orsino made his major league debut on July 14, 1961 against the Pittsburgh Pirates at Candlestick Park.  He was the starting catcher and went 0-for-3 with 3 putouts, 2 assists, an error, and a passed ball.  The Giants lost, 6–4.  The next day was a lot better; he was in the starting lineup again and went 1-for-3 with a walk, a run batted in, a run scored, and no errors in the field as the Giants crushed the Pirates 8–3.

He was acquired along with Stu Miller and Mike McCormick by the Orioles from the Giants for Jack Fisher, Billy Hoeft and Jimmie Coker on December 15, 1962. His best season was 1963, when he had career highs in games played (116), hits (103), at bats (379), home runs (19), runs batted in (56), runs scored (53), and on-base percentage (.349).  The Orioles had a good year, winning 86 games and losing 76.

At Memorial Stadium on September 12, 1964, Orsino was the Orioles starting catcher in a rare battle of complete game one-hitters, between Baltimore's Frank Bertaina and Bob Meyer of the Kansas City Athletics. Orsino doubled to lead off the bottom of the eighth inning of the scoreless game, and teammate Bob Saverine came in to pinch run for him.  Saverine advanced to third on a Bertaina sacrifice bunt, and then scored when Jackie Brandt hit a sacrifice fly.

Career totals for 332 games include 252 hits, 40 home runs, 123 runs batted in, 114 runs scored, a .249 batting average, and a slugging percentage of .420.

Post-retirement
Orsino was the baseball coach at Fairleigh Dickinson University from 1970 to 1976 and again in 1980. He went on to coach a university men's golf team in 2004. He had two children from his first marriage, Jeryl, a fitness professional, and John (Jay) Orsino, a golf pro,  and three grandchildren. Charlie, Wyatt and Oliver Orsino.

John Orsino died on November 1, 2016 in Sunny Isles Beach, Florida at age 78.

Highlights
Hit a combined .324 (22-for-68) against All-Star pitchers Jim Bouton, Harvey Haddix, Tommy John, Gary Peters and Stan Williams
Hit a combined .323 (10-for-31) against Hall of Fame pitchers Jim Bunning and Whitey Ford

References

External links
, or Retrosheet

1938 births
2016 deaths
Baltimore Orioles players
Baseball coaches from New Jersey
Baseball players from New Jersey
Chattanooga Lookouts managers
College golf coaches in the United States
Eugene Emeralds players
Fairleigh Dickinson Knights baseball coaches
Fort Lee High School alumni
Hawaii Islanders players
Major League Baseball catchers
Michigan City White Caps players
People from Fort Lee, New Jersey
People from Sunny Isles Beach, Florida
People from Teaneck, New Jersey
Phoenix Giants players
Portland Beavers players
Rio Grande Valley Giants players
St. Cloud Rox players
San Francisco Giants players
Savannah Senators players
Sportspeople from Bergen County, New Jersey
Syracuse Chiefs players
Tacoma Giants players
Washington Senators (1961–1971) players
York White Roses players